Boutigny-sur-Essonne (literally Boutigny on Essonne) is a commune in the Essonne department in Île-de-France in northern France.

The nearby villages are La Ferté-Alais (aerodrome of Cerny – Jean Baptiste Salis: Annual international meeting) and Milly-la-Forêt (house of Jean Cocteau, historical village).

To see in Boutigny: the golf course of Belesbat and its 17th-century-old castle, cressonières, edges of the Essonne.

Boutigny-sur-Essonne is twinned with Lans, Austria, since April 23, 1961.

Inhabitants of Boutigny-sur-Essonne are known as Botignacois in French.

Geography
It is located 47 kilometers south-east of Paris, between Étampes and Corbeil-Essonnes.
It is 23 kilometers south west of Évry, 16 kilometers east of Étampes, 6 kilometers south of La Ferté-Alais, 8 kilometers north west of Milly-la-Forêt, 20 kilometers south east of Arpajon, 21 kilometers south west of Corbeil-Essonnes, 24 kilometers south east of Montlhéry, 29 kilometers south east of Dourdan, 32 kilometers south east of Palaiseau. It is also located 67 kilometers away south west of its homonym Boutigny and Seine-et-Marne and 68 kilometers south east of Boutigny-Prouais in Eure-et-Loir department.

Environmental heritage
Decorated cave of Malabry
Boutigny-sur-Essonne was awarded by three flowers during the most flowered village and city competition. Water banks of Essonne and the woods surrounding the village have been listed to sensitive natural space by the conseil général de l'Essonne.

Transport
Boutigny-sur-Essonne is accessible by suburban train: the RER D, direction Malesherbes, Boutigny-sur-Essonne Station.

See also
Communes of the Essonne department

References

External links

Official website 

Mayors of Essonne Association 

Communes of Essonne